Anne Palmer may refer to:

 Anne Lennard, Countess of Sussex (1661–1722), née Palmer
 Anne Brewis (née Palmer, 1911–2002), English botanist
 Anne Palmer (cricketer) (1915–2006), Test cricketer for Australia